Mantius is a spider genus of the jumping spider family, Salticidae.

There is no recent information on any of the five described species from south east Asia. The genus is said to be close to Ptocasius.

Description
The cephalothorax is often dark reddish brown. The abdomen is yellowish brown with whitish hairs and plump oval. The legs are yellowish brown except for the front pair, which is reddish brown.

Name
Mantius was the son of Melampus and Lysippe in Greek mythology.

Species
 Mantius armipotens Peckham & Peckham, 1907 – Borneo
 Mantius difficilis Peckham & Peckham, 1907 – Borneo
 Mantius frontosus (Simon, 1899) – Java
 Mantius ravidus (Simon, 1899) – Sumatra
 Mantius russatus Thorell, 1891 – Malaysia

Footnotes

References
  (2000): An Introduction to the Spiders of South East Asia. Malaysian Nature Society, Kuala Lumpur.
  (2007): The world spider catalog, version 8.0. American Museum of Natural History.

Salticidae
Spiders of Asia
Salticidae genera